The Institutional Protection Service is a service branch of the Panamanian Public Forces. The Institutional Protection Service was organized in March 1990 to assume the functions previously assigned to the former presidential guard. Based in Panama City, attached to the Ministry of the Presidency. He is in charge of providing protection to the Panamanian authorities such as the President of the Republic of Panama, the Ministers, Ex-Presidents and the Ex-Vice Presidents in charge of the Presidency of the Republic, as provided in this Decree Law; as well as contributing to the maintenance of internal public order, peace, citizen security, protecting public spaces and buildings.

It was created through Decree Law No. 2 of July 8, 1999. Some of its functions also include the protection of the banks of the Panama Canal and surveillance of public spaces such as the Cinta Costera and Calzada de Amador.

It has approximately more than 2,000 units that are distributed in 3 different company groups.

Organic Structure

As part of this organization they have the political and executive level, coordination level, advisory level, supervisory level, support level and within the operational level they have 3 groups which are:

The Presidential Protection group: This has the responsibility of providing protection and escorting Important Persons.

The Presidential Guard Battalion: This other has the responsibility of ensuring the security of the facilities, as well as the protocol of honor, the custody of the banks of the Canal, the security of different facilities where official events or presidential summits are held. Organized into the Presidential Band and 5 companies, the 5th historical.

The Special Anti-Terrorism Group (G.E.A.T): The latter is a group of special forces under the command of the President of the Republic.

Training
In terms of training, there is an Integral Training and Training Academy, in which the personnel are trained and remain in constant training, which has allowed the professional level of the units to be raised, maintaining constant cooperation with the rest of the Public Force, where he has participated in various exercises, such as the last Panamax event, held in our country; Many of the units that make up the Institution have received training in Central, South American and European countries.

The Institutional Protection Service has been a model for the creation of similar Institutions in other Central American countries.

References

1990 establishments in South America
Law enforcement in Panama

External links